Greenland is one of the 12 multi-member constituencies of the Folketing, the national legislature of the Kingdom of Denmark. The constituency was established in 1975 following the merger of the two constituencies that covered Greenland. The constituency currently elects two of the 179 members of the Folketing using the open party-list proportional representation electoral system. At the 2022 general election it had 41,305 registered electors.

Electoral system
Greenland currently elects two of the 179 members of the Folketing using the open party-list proportional representation electoral system. Seats are allocated using the D'Hondt method.

Election results

Summary

Detailed

2020s

2022
Results of the 2022 general election held on 1 November 2022:

The following candidates were elected:
Aaja Chemnitz (IA), 4,296 votes; and Aki-Matilda Høegh-Dam (S), 6,670 votes.

2010s

2019
Results of the 2019 general election held on 5 June 2019:

The following candidates were elected:
Aki-Matilda Høegh-Dam (S), 3,475 votes; and Aaja Chemnitz Larsen (IA), 5,669 votes.

2015
Results of the 2015 general election held on 18 June 2015:

The following candidates were elected:
Aleqa Hammond (S), 3,759 votes; and Aaja Chemnitz Larsen (IA), 2,541 votes.

2011
Results of the 2011 general election held on 15 September 2011:

The following candidates were elected:
Doris J. Jensen (S), 5,621 votes; and Sara Olsvig (IA), 7,956 votes.

2000s

2007
Results of the 2007 general election held on 13 November 2007:

The following candidates were elected:
Juliane Henningsen (IA), 5,170 votes; and Lars-Emil Johansen (S), 5,621 votes.

2005
Results of the 2005 general election held on 8 February 2005:

The following candidates were elected:
Lars-Emil Johansen (S), 4,784 votes; and Kuupik Kleist (IA), 5,187 votes.

2001
Results of the 2001 general election held on 20 November 2001:

The following candidates were elected:
Lars-Emil Johansen (S), 5,097 votes; and Kuupik Kleist (IA), 6,369 votes.

1990s

1998
Results of the 1998 general election held on 11 March 1998:

The following candidates were elected:
Ellen Kristensen (A), 3,941 votes; and Hans-Pavia Rosing (S), 3,608 votes.

1994
Results of the 1994 general election held on 21 September 1994:

The following candidates were elected:
Hans-Pavia Rosing (i), 7,315 votes; and Otto Steenholdt (A), 4,541 votes.

1990
Results of the 1990 general election held on 12 December 1990:

The following candidates were elected:
Hans-Pavia Rosing (S), 8,128 votes; and Otto Steenholdt (A), 5,417 votes.

1980s

1988
Results of the 1988 general election held on 10 May 1988:

The following candidates were elected:
Hans-Pavia Rosing (S), 5,446 votes; and Otto Steenholdt (A), 6,429 votes.

1987
Results of the 1987 general election held on 8 September 1987:

The following candidates were elected:
Hans-Pavia Rosing (S), 3,861 votes; and Otto Steenholdt (A), 5,662 votes.

1984
Results of the 1984 general election held on 10 January 1984:

The following candidates were elected:
Preben Lange (S), 4,352 votes; and Otto Steenholdt (A), 5,875 votes.

1981
Results of the 1981 general election held on 8 December 1981:

The following candidates were elected:
Preben Lange (S), 4,455 votes; and Otto Steenholdt (A), 7,500 votes.

1970s

1979
Results of the 1979 general election held on 23 October 1979:

The following candidates were elected:
Preben Lange (S), 2,589 votes; and Otto Steenholdt (A), 4,826 votes.

1977
Results of the 1977 general election held on 15 February 1977:

The following candidates were elected:
Lars-Emil Johansen (Kf2), 5,915 votes; and Otto Steenholdt (Kf1), 4,645 votes.

1975
Results of the 1975 general election held on 9 January 1975:

The following candidates were elected:
Lars-Emil Johansen (Kf2), 7,775 votes; and Nikolaj Rosing (Kf1), 3,638 votes.

References

Folketing constituency
Constituencies established in 1975
Folketing constituencies
Folketing constituency